Havering Hockey Club is a field hockey club based in Hornchurch which is in the London Borough of Havering, east London, England.  The club consists of 4 Men's teams and 4 Ladies teams playing at varying levels. The club currently plays its home fixtures at Campion School in Hornchurch and its clubhouse is in Harrow Lodge Park.

The team plays its home games at Campion school, Hornchurch.

History

Originally called the Hornchurch Hockey club, which was founded in 1922, the name was changed by Mrs E Gallant, then chairman of the council's leisure committee, in order to accommodate those outside Hornchurch.

While originally sharing a pitch with the RAF Hornchurch, the club moved in 1972 to Harrow Lodge Park, on the request of Havering Council. This is where they have their clubhouse today, some 40 years later.

External links
Havering Hockey Club
East Hockey League Page
Essex Hockey League Page

References
Havering Hockey Club

Sport in the London Borough of Havering
English field hockey clubs
1922 establishments in England
Hornchurch
Field hockey clubs established in 1922